Tillie is a feminine given name, a nickname and a surname. It may refer to:

Given name or nickname

Women
 Tillie Anderson (1875–1965), Swedish road and track cyclist, member of the United States Bicycling Hall of Fame
 Tillie Baldwin (1888–1958), born Anna Mathilda Winger, American rodeo contestant and performer, member of the National Cowgirl Hall of Fame and the National Cowboy Hall of Fame
 Tillie Ehringhaus (1890–1980), First Lady of North Carolina
 Tillie K. Fowler (1942–2005), American politician
 Tillie Hardwick (1924–1999), Pomo Indian woman instrumental in reversing the California Indian Rancheria termination policy of the U.S. government
 Ottilie Tillie Klimek (1876–1936), Polish-American serial killer
 Tillie Lewis (1901–1977), American businesswoman and entrepreneur
 Tillie Moreno (born 1953), Filipino R&B/soul/pop singer
 Tillie Olsen (1912–2007), American writer and early feminist
 Tillie Paul (1863–1952), Tlingit translator and Christian missionaries
 Tillie S. Pine (1896–1999), American children's writer
 Tillie Taylor (1922–2011), Canadian judge and social activist, first female magistrate in the province of Saskatchewan
 Tillie Walden (1996), American cartoonist
 Tillie Pierce (1848-1914), author of At Gettysburg, or What A Girl Saw and Heard of the Battle: A True Narrative.

Men
 Henry Tillie Lamar (1865–1891), American college football player
 Taldon Tillie Manton (1910–1991), American National Football League player
 Arthur Tillie Shafer (1889–1962), American Major League Baseball player
 Walter Tillie Voss (1897–1975), American National Football League player

Surname
A family of French sportspeople:
 Laurent Tillie (born 1963), volleyball player and coach; father of:
 Kim Tillie (born 1988), basketball player
 Kévin Tillie (born 1990), volleyball player
 Killian Tillie (born 1998), basketball player

See also
 Tillie (disambiguation)
 Tilly (disambiguation)

Feminine given names
Lists of people by nickname